SS Equipoise was a Panamanian Cargo ship that was torpedoed by the German submarine U-160 in the Atlantic Ocean  south east of Cape Henry, Virginia, United States on 27 March 1942.

Construction 
Equipoise was launched on 27 December 1905 and completed on 16 March 1906 at the Barclay, Curle & Co. Ltd. shipyard in Glasgow, Scotland, United Kingdom. Triple expansion steam engine driving a single screw propeller. The ship could generate 784 n.h.p. with a speed of 12 knots. She was also armed with a 4 inch deck gun on the stern and 4 machine guns of which two were mounted on the bridge and two on the stern, all of which the crew were trained to handle.

Sinking 
The torpedo struck the ship on the starboard side between hatches number one and two and also blew out the bottom. The ship sank in two minutes which gave the crew only enough time to launch two lifeboats and two rafts. The first lifeboat however quickly capsized as it hit the water while the other was launched empty. In total nine survivors managed to board the empty lifeboat with a few others boarding the rafts.

The seriously injured captain died shortly after the sinking on board the lifeboat and was buried at sea, which made the third mate the only surviving officer of the ship. The 13 survivors were rescued two days after the sinking by USS Greer and brought to Norfolk Naval Base.

Wreck 

References

1905 ships
Cargo ships of the United Kingdom
Steamships of Panama
Ships built in Glasgow
World War II shipwrecks in the Atlantic Ocean
Ships sunk by German submarines in World War II
Maritime incidents in March 1942
Cargo ships of Italy
Cargo ships of Panama